Black Art is a poem written by African-American poet and writer Amiri Baraka. It was written in 1965 after the assassination of Malcolm X, soon after the poet (formerly LeRoi Jones) had taken on a new name.The poem issued a clarion call for art by and for Black people:

We want a black poem. And a 
Black World.
Let the world be a Black Poem
And Let All Black People Speak This Poem
Silently
or LOUD

The poem sparked the beginning of the Black Arts Movement in poetry. "Black Art" was published in The Liberator in January 1966, and subsequently re-published in numerous anthologies.

Interpretations 
The poem is described as one of Baraka’s most expressive political poems, as it uses sharp language, onomatopoeia and violence to call out the nation. The poem itself is about poems and how black artists must stand for being black and not copy or imitate white poets. Baraka is calling for black artists to have meaning in their art and produce content that defends their blackness. Baraka felt that his work should fully divulge the nationwide racism and create “poems that kill”. Baraka uses terms such as “negroleader”, “jewlady’s”, and “whities” to clearly explain that his message is targeting the race hardships faced for people of color living in the south in the 1960s.

It uses strong imagery to focus on the violence and allow the readers to slip into the mind of Baraka and experience the poem as their own life. “Let there be no love poems written until love can exist freely and cleanly.” Baraka calls for realism in black poetry, to stop cookie cutting away and over-glorifying the lives that black people must live in a racist nation. He wants the black people to understand that they must achieve a black aesthetic and a black worldview in order to be free from the race constraints placed on them by white society.

A poem such as "Black Art" (1965), according to Werner Sollors, of Harvard University, expressed the authors need to commit the violence required to "establish a Black World".

Baraka even uses onomatopoeia in "Black Art" to express that need for violence: "rrrrrrrrrrrrrrrrrrrrrrrrrrrrrrrrrrr . . . tuhtuhtuhtuhtuhtuht . . ." More specifically, lines in "Black Art" such as "Let there be no love poems written / until love can exist freely and cleanly" juxtaposed with "We want a black poem. / And a Black World" demonstrate Baraka's cry for political justice during a time when racial injustice was rampant, despite the Civil Rights Movement.

Amiri Baraka's "Black Art" serves as one of his most controversial, yet poetically profound supplements to the Black Arts Movement. In this piece, Baraka merges politics with art, criticizing poems that are not useful to or adequately representative of the Black struggle. First published in 1966, a period particularly known for the Civil Rights Movement, the political aspect of this piece underscores the need for a concrete and artistic approach to the realistic nature involving racism and injustice. Serving as the recognized artistic component to and having roots in the Civil Rights Movement, the Black Arts Movement aims to grant a political voice to black artists (including poets, dramatists, writers, musicians, etc.). Playing a vital role in this movement, Baraka calls out what he considers to be unproductive and assimilatory actions shown by political leaders during the Civil Rights Movement. He describes prominent Black leaders as being "on the steps of the white house...kneeling between the sheriff's thighs negotiating coolly for his people." Baraka also presents issues of euro-centric mentality, by referring to Elizabeth Taylor as a prototypical model in a society that influences perceptions of beauty, emphasizing its influence on individuals of white and black ancestry. Baraka aims his message toward the Black community, with the purpose of coalescing African Americans into a unified movement, devoid of white influences. "Black Art" serves as a medium for expression meant to strengthen that solidarity and creativity, in terms of the Black Aesthetic. Baraka believes poems should "shoot…come at you, love what you are" and not succumb to mainstream desires.

He ties this approach into the emergence of hip-hop, which he paints as a movement that presents "live words…and live flesh and coursing blood." Baraka's cathartic structure and aggressive tone are comparable to the beginnings of hip-hop music, which created controversy in the realm of mainstream acceptance, because of its  "authentic, un-distilled, unmediated forms of contemporary black urban music." Baraka believes that integration inherently takes away from the legitimacy of having a Black identity and Aesthetic in an anti-Black world. Through pure and unapologetic blackness, and with the absence of white influences, Baraka believes a black world can be achieved. Though hip-hop has been serving as a recognized salient musical form of the Black Aesthetic, a history of unproductive integration is seen across the spectrum of music, beginning with the emergence of a newly formed narrative in mainstream appeal in the 1950s. Much of Baraka's cynical disillusionment with unproductive integration can be drawn from the 50s, a period of rock and roll, in which "record labels actively sought to have white artists "cover" songs that were popular on the rhythm-and-blues charts" originally performed by African American artists. The problematic nature of unproductive integration is also exemplified by Run-DMC, an American Hip-Hop group founded in 1981, who became widely accepted after a calculated collaboration with the rock group Aerosmith on a remake of the latter's "Walk This Way" took place in 1986, evidently appealing to young white audiences. Hip-Hop emerged as an evolving genre of music that continuously challenged mainstream acceptance, most notably with the development of rap in the 1990s. A significant and modern example of this is Ice Cube, a well-known American rapper, songwriter, and actor, who introduced subgenre of hip-hop known as "gangsta rap," merged social consciousness and political expression with music. With the 1960s serving as a more blatantly racist period of time, Baraka notes the revolutionary nature of hip-hop, grounded in the unmodified expression through art. This method of expression in music parallels significantly with Baraka's ideals presented in "Black Art," focusing on poetry that is also productively and politically driven.

References

External links
 Baraka, Amiri. "Black Art (Word document)." George Hartley.
 Mack, Dwayne. "Baraka, Amiri (1934–2014)." Baraka, Amiri (1934–2014) | The Black Past: Remembered and Reclaimed. BlackPast.org.

1965 poems
Black Power
Poetry by Amiri Baraka
Black Arts Movement